Ted Sullivan may refer to: 

Ted Sullivan (baseball) (1851–1929), Timothy Paul "Ted" Sullivan, Major League Baseball manager
Ted Sullivan (filmmaker) (born 1971), Edward Sullivan, screenwriter and director
Ted Sullivan (Coronation Street), fictional character on the British soap opera Coronation Street

See also
Edward Sullivan (disambiguation)